Pittsburgh Panthers women's volleyball is the NCAA Division I intercollegiate volleyball program of the University of Pittsburgh, often referred to as "Pitt", located in Pittsburgh, Pennsylvania. The Pitt volleyball team competes in the Atlantic Coast Conference (ACC) and plays their home games in Fitzgerald Field House. Since the founding of the volleyball program in 1974, the Panthers have had a winning season all but four years, have one of the nation's top all-time winning percentages, have appearanced in 21 national championship tournaments, and have won 14 conference championships including eleven as a member of the Big East Conference and four since joining the ACC.

History

The beginning
Pitt women's volleyball was founded in 1974 and was led during its first season by coach Mary Kromer who guided the team, originally nicknamed the Pantherettes, to a 14–3 record in their first year of existence. Perhaps more impressively, in the first year of the program, and despite the fact that two of the starters never played volleyball before, the team was invited to participate in the Eastern Association for Intercollegiate Athletics for Women (EAIAW) regional championship, where the team advanced to the quarterfinals. Kromer continued as coach for the programs second season, in which the team posted an 18–2 record and again appeared in the EAIAW regional championships.

Mike Hebert years

Prior to the 1976 season, Mike Hebert, a former player at the UC-Santa Barbara who was teaching at Pitt, was asked by the university to coach the women's team although he'd never seen women play volleyball. He eventually accepted the part-time job to coach the up-start program for $1,500. Without many collegiate women's team sports in existence in the mid-1970s, Hebert and his team were pioneers who "invented things as [they] went along". Despite this, Herbert guided the Panthers to a fourth-place finish in the EAIAW championships during his first two seasons. Under his guidance, Pitt broke through to national prominence in 1978 winning the EAIAW Championship and advancing to the Association for Intercollegiate Athletics for Women (AIAW) National Large College Volleyball Championships where they finished with a 2–3 record and a 13th place national finish en route to the program's first 40-win season. His part-time position turning full-time in his final season in 1979, which saw the Panthers successfully defend their EAIAW Championship and earn a return trip to the AIWA national championships. During this span he also collected EAIAW Eastern Region Coach of the Year awards at Pitt in 1978 and 1979. Herbert, who also served as an assistant coach for Pitt's men's team for the last two years of his stay in Pittsburgh, then left, citing family reasons, to take the head coaching job at the New Mexico, eventually coaching at Illinois and Minnesota; along the way winning multiple national championships, the national coach of the year award, and earning induction into the American Volleyball Coaches Association Hall of Fame.

Shelton Collier years
The program next turned to Ohio State assistant Shelton Collier, who in his initial season as head coach in 1980 guided the Panthers to a school record with 41 wins, and followed up in 1981 with a season that included a win at eighth-ranked Pepperdine, an EAIWA Championship, and a ninth-place finish in the final year of the AIAW national championships.  In 1982, the women's volleyball program transitioned both into the NCAA, which took over the sponsorship of intercollegiate athletics from the AIWA, as well as into the Big East Conference. In addition, the program permanently moved their home games from their primary home in Trees Hall to the larger Fitzgerald Field House, which had previously hosted select volleyball tournaments and  games. During Collier's tenure, Pitt established itself as the dominant volleyball team in the Big East from the start, winning the regular season Big East Southern Division tournament, without losing a game and losing only one set, in every year in which it competed: 1982, 1983, and 1984. Pitt also won the first ever Big East Tournament in 1982 without losing a game en route to the program's second 41-win season. Collier guided Pitt to capture additional Big East Tournament crowns in 1984, 1986, and 1988 and appeared in the NCAA Women's Volleyball Championship in 1982, 1984, 1986, and 1987.

Sue Woodstra years

Sue Woodstra, a silver medalist for the U.S. National Volleyball Team at the 1984 Summer Olympics, took over the Pitt program in 1989. During her tenure, she led her teams to Big East Conference tournament championships in each season as well as three Big East regular season championships, winning the regular season each year from when the Big East instituted round-robin play in 1990. She also led the Panthers to four post-season appearances including one Women's Invitation Volleyball Championship appearance in 1989 in which Pitt finished third, and three NCAA volleyball tournaments, including in 1990 where Pitt reached the regional semifinal and finished ranked 18th in the final American Volleyball Coaches Association (AVCA) Coaches poll. Woodstra's teams NCAA tournament teams were led by standout second team All-American outside hitter Ann Marie Lucanie, who won the Big East Tournament MVP award four straight years as well as a record three straight Big East Player of the Year awards, including in her senior year in 1993 under new head coach Cindy Alvear. In total, Woodstra compiled an overall record of 110–39 (.738) over four seasons as head coach.

Alvear and Beerman years
Cindy Alvear took over in 1993 leading Pitt to Big East regular season championships, Big East Tournament championships, and NCAA Tournament appearances in her first two seasons. This was followed by second-place finishes in both the Big East regular season and tournaments in 1995 and 1996 with a National Invitational Volleyball tournament appearance in 1995. Pitt program slipped in the late 1990s, experiencing its first losing  Big East record in 1999. Chris Beerman took over the program in 2000 and helped lead the team back to a winning conference record. A losing record in 2001, Pitt's first ever, snapped one of the longest NCAA records for consecutive winning seasons. However, the Panthers rebounded in a big way in 2003 by winning the Big East regular season and tournament championship and advancing into the second round of the NCAA tournament. A second-place finish Big East finish and at-large bid to the NCAA tournament followed in 2004, before the program experienced only its third losing season in 2007.

Toby Rens years
Toby Rens was hired to take over the program in 2008, immediately restoring the program to a winning season and his first year. In 2009, despite being picked to finish eighth in the Big East, Rens guided the Panthers to a school record twelve Big East wins and a second-place finish behind Big East Player of the Year and third team All-American middle hitter Meagan Dooley. Heading into the 2010 season, the Panthers faced ten 2009 NCAA Tournament participants, but faltered to 13–18 record and a loss in the first round of the Big East Tournament. This was followed by an 18–15 record and a 17–14 record in 2011 and 2012, respectively. Following the 2012 season, Rens accepted the head coaching job at Chicago State University.

Dan Fisher era

Dan Fisher arrived as head coach the same year that Pitt entered the Atlantic Coast Conference in 2013. Fisher, who led Concordia University-Irvine to the 2012 NAIA national championship with an overall two-year record of 72–2. led Pitt to a fifth-place finish in its first year in the ACC, exceeding pre-season expectations that had Pitt picked to finish 13th in the conference.  Pitt improved to 25–6 in Fisher's second year at Pitt. He led the Panthers back to the NCAA tournament in 2016 and 2017, as well as to the program's first ACC conference championship in 2017, for which he received ACC and AVCA East Coast Region Coach of the Year honors. In 2018, he led Pitt to its first top five AVCA coaches poll ranking in program history and its second straight ACC Championship and earned his second straight ACC Coach of the Year honors.  In 2019, the program reached the highest national ranking ever achieved by an ACC team when it was voted #2 in the AVCA coaches poll, won its third straight ACC conference championship with an 18-0 conference record, and received a program best sixth seed in the NCAA tournament. In the 2020 season, the NCAA postponed the volleyball tournament to April due to the COVID-19 Pandemic. As a result, the ACC scheduled was altered to eight fall matches and the remainder in the spring. After a 4–4 record in the fall schedule, the Panthers won twelve straight matches to finish the regular season 16–4. In the NCAA tournament, the Panthers would make program history by advancing past the second round for the first time after a sweep of #14 overall seed Utah. In the following round, Pitt upset #3 overall seed Minnesota in five sets to advance to its first Regional Final in school history. Pitt finished the season ranked #8 on the final AVCA Coaches’ Poll, their highest final ranking in program history.

In the 2021 season, the Panthers came back from their tournament run by starting the season 15–0, and finishing 26–3. Their regular season included big wins over then No. 23 Rice, No. 18 Washington State, No.9 Baylor, No. 12 BYU, and No. 13 Georgia Tech. For their quality RPI, they Panthers earned the #3 seed in the NCAA tournament, their best in program history. In the second round of the tournament, the Panthers defeated rival Penn State for the first time in postseason history in a tight 3–1 win at the Petersen Events Center. Upon advancing, the Panthers earned the right to host their first Regional, and held their first ever tournament matches at Fitzgerald Field House. In the Round of 16, the Panthers easily swept Kansas before meeting #6 Purdue in the Regional Final. After Purdue won a lengthy second set, 30–28, the Panthers powered from there winning the next two sets on its home floor to earn its first National semifinal appearance in program history.

Team awards and accomplishments

Postseason national tournaments
Since the founding of its volleyball program in 1974, Pitt has participated in post-season volleyball tournaments in 25 different seasons. Post-season play include 16 NCAA Women's Volleyball Championship tournament appearances, 3 AIAW National Championship appearances, 8 EAIAW Regional championship appearances, and two NIVC tournament appearances.

AIWA
Prior to the NCAA taking on the administration of women's sports and championships in 1981, the AIWA and its regional affiliates conducted regional and national championships in volleyball. In 1981, schools could compete in either the AIWA and NCAA and both organizations held championships, but by 1982, only the NCAA remained.

Regionals
EAIWA Regional Championship appearances (8)

Nationals
AIWA national championship appearances (3)

1979 AIWA National Division I Volleyball Championship (1–3)
Pool 4
L Pacific 13–15, 6–15
W Southern Illinois 15–8, 15–12
L Pepperdine 15–11, 5–15, 13–15
L Ohio State 6–15, 2–15

NCAA
Pitt has participated in 17 NCAA Women's Volleyball Championships and has an overall record of 12–16 in the tournament.

1982
L San Luis Obispo (0–3) 9–15, 2–15, 5–15
1984
L Nebraska (0–3) 6–15, 10–15, 16–18
1986
L Nebraska (1–3) 15–11, 5–15, 10–15, 7–15
1987
L Illinois (1–3) 15–5, 4–15, 3–15, 2–15
1990
W Ohio State (3–1) 15–12, 15–13, 9–15, 15–13
L Nebraska (0–3) 7–15, 11–15, 7–15
1991
L Ohio State (1–3) 9–15, 15–17, 15–9, 7–15
1992
L Stanford (0–3) 3–15, 2–15, 4–15
1993
L George Washington (2–3) 13–15, 15–10, 9–15, 15–12, 13–15
1994
W Iowa (3–2) 5–15, 16–14, 4–15, 16–14, 15–10
L Notre Dame (1–3) 15–9, 11–15, 13–15, 13–15
2003
W Penn (3–1) 28–30, 30–16, 30–18, 30–26
L Penn State (1–3) 30–25, 31–33, 21–30, 21–30
2004
L Ohio (0–3) 22–30, 26–30, 12–30
2016
W Dayton (3–1) 20–25, 25–19, 27–25, 25–19
L Penn State (1–3) 25–20, 16–25, 13–25, 18–25

2017
W VCU (3–1) 25–14, 25–20, 18–25, 25–13
L Penn State (1–3) 20–25, 25–23, 22–25, 19–25
2018
W Iona (3–0) 26–24, 25–18, 25-15
L Michigan (2–3) 25–19, 22–25, 17–25, 25–21, 9-15
2019
W Howard (3–0) 25–9, 25–21, 25–14
L Cincinnati (2–3) 26–24, 21–25, 25–16, 21–25, 13–15
2020
W Long Island University (3–0) 26–24, 25–11, 25–10
W Utah (3–0) 25–16, 25–18, 25–19
W Minnesota (3-2) 21-25, 25-23, 20-25, 25-21, 15-11
L Washington (2-3) 25-20, 25-21, 16-25, 24-26, 9-15
2021
W UMBC (3-0) 25-23, 25-13, 25-18
W Penn State (3-1) 25-22, 23-25, 25-22, 25-23
W Kansas (3-0) 25-19, 25-21, 25-18
W Purdue (3-1) 25-20, 28-30, 25-20, 25-15
L Nebraska (1-3) 25-16, 17-25, 20-25, 22-25
2022
W Colgate (3-0) 25-16, 25-14, 25-14
W BYU (3-0) 25-21, 25-22, 25-18
W Florida (3-1) 25-20, 25-21, 17-25, 25-22
W Wisconsin (3-2) 23-25, 25-21, 25-21, 19-25, 15-13
L Louisville (2-3) 18-25, 25-23, 22-25, 25-22, 2-15

NIVC
The National Invitational Volleyball Championship (NIVC) was founded in 1989 as the Women's Invitational Volleyball Championship (WIVC). The post-season tournament existed for seven seasons from 1989 to 1995. Pitt participated in the post-season tournament in two seasons, finishing in third place in 1989.

Big East Championships

While a member of the Big East Conference between 1982 and 2012, Pitt won more Big East tournament championships (11) than any other school, winning seven straight from 1988 to 1994. Additionally, Pitt has been the Big East tournament runner-up five times. The Big East Conference began holding conference tournaments to crown a champion in 1982, but did not conduct round-robin play and crown a regular season champion until 1990. Prior to 1990, the Big East schools were organized into divisions and sometimes held regular-season divisional tournaments.

Big East Championship Tournament

Big East tournament champions (11)

Big East Tournament Runner-up (5)

Big East regular season
The Big East did not begin sponsoring regular season conference play and regular season standings until 1990. Since that time, Pitt had won six regular season Big East Championships and finished second four times.

Big East regular season champions (6)

Big East Regular Season Runner-Up (4)

Big East Southern Division Tournament
In some years, prior to the establishment of round-robin conference play and standings in 1990, the Big East held regular season division tournaments. In the three years that Pitt participated in the Big East Southern Division Tournament, it did not lose a match and lost only one set to claim three Big East Southern Division Tournament titles.

Big East Southern Division tournament champions (3)

ACC Championships
Pitt became a member of the Atlantic Coast Conference (ACC) in 2013 and won its first ACC championship in 2017 and a subsequent conference championships in 2018 and 2019.  The ACC recognizes the regular season champion as the conference champion and has not held a conference championship tournament since Pitt joined the conference.

Individual awards and honors

National awards

 AVCA All-Americans
1993 Ann Marie Lucanie, Second-team
2003 Wendy Hatlestad, Third-team
2009 Megan Dooley, Third-team
2018 Nika Markovic, Third-team
2019 Kayla Lund, Second-team
2020 Kayla Lund, Second-team
2020 Chinaza Ndee, Second-team
2021 Kayla Lund, Second-team
2021 Chinaza Ndee, Second-team
2022 Courtney Buzzerio, First-team
2022 Serena Gray, First-team
2022 Valeria Vasquez-Gomez, Second-team
2022 Rachel Fairbanks, Third-team

 Honorable Mentions
1984 Ulana Kohutiak, Volleyball Monthly
1987 Denise Frawley, Volleyball Monthly
1988 Denise Frawley, Volleyball Monthly
1990 Jenelle Lantagne, Asics
1993 Ann Marie Lucanie, Asics
2003 Megan Miller, AVCA
2004 Megan Miller, AVCA
2004 Gini Ullery, AVCA
2004 Megan McGrane, AVCA

 
2005 Megan McGrane, AVCA
2006 Diana Andreyko, AVCA
2009 Michelle Rossi, AVCA
2011 Kiesha Leggs, AVCA
2014 Amanda Orchard, AVCA
2015 Amanda Orchard, AVCA
2015 Kadi Kullerkann, AVCA
2016 Jenna Potts, AVCA
2016 Stephanie Williams, AVCA 

 
2017 Nika Markovic, AVCA
2017 Stephanie Williams, AVCA
2018 Kayla Lund, AVCA
2018 Layne Van Buskirk, AVCA
2018 Stephanie Williams, AVCA
2019 Chinaza Ndee, AVCA
2019 Layne Van Buskirk, AVCA
2020 Chiamaka Nwokolo, AVCA
2021 Leketor Member-Meneh, AVCA
2021 Kayla Lund, AVCA
2021 Chinaza Ndee, AVCA

Academic All-Americans
1983 Judy Young, CoSIDA
1985 Judy Young, CoSIDA
1987 Noreen Coughlin
2009 Meagan Dooley, ESPN the Magazine First Team & CoSIDA

Conference awards

 Player of the Year/Regular Season MVP
1985 Sue Hoover (Big East South Division)
1986 Sue Hoover (Big East South Division)
1987 Denise Frawley (Big East South Division)
1990 Jenelle Lantagne (Big East)
1991 Ann Marie Lucanie (Big East)
1992 Ann Marie Lucanie (Big East)
1993 Ann Marie Lucanie (Big East)
2003 Wendy Hatlestad (Big East)
2004 Megan Miller (Big East)
2009 Meagan Dooley (Big East)
2019 Kayla Lund (ACC)
2020 Kayla Lund (ACC)

 Big East Tournament MOP
1982 Julie Gaul
1984 Ulana Kohutiak
1986 Lisa Stewart
1988 Denise Frawley
1989 Jenelle Lantagne
1990 Ann Marie Lucanie
1991 Ann Marie Lucanie
1992 Ann Marie Lucanie
1993 Ann Marie Lucanie
1994 Carrie Thornton
2003 Megan Miller

 Libero of the Year
2003 Megan McGrane (Big East)
2005 Megan McGrane (Big East)
2009 Michelle Rossi (Big East)

 Setter of the Year
2016 Kamalani Akeo (ACC)

 Rookie of the Year
1987 Jenelle Lantagne (Big East)
1990 Anne Marie Lucanie (Big East)
2004 Diana Andreyko (Big East)

 Coach of the Year
1987 Shelton Collier (Big East)
1990 Sue Woodstra (Big East)
2003 Chris Beerman (Big East)
2017 Dan Fisher (ACC)
2018 Dan Fisher (ACC)

 Female Scholar-Athlete of the Year (across all sports)
1987–88 Noreen Coughlin (Big East)
2009–10 Meagan Dooley (Big East)

Pitt Volleyball Season by Season Results

See also
List of NCAA Division I women's volleyball programs

References

External links